Nantahala Outdoor Center (NOC) is a commercial outdoor guide service and retail store located at 13077 Highway 19 West, Bryson City, NC 28713. It opened in 1972 when Payson and Aurelia Kennedy and Horace Holden Sr. took over the old Tote 'N Tarry Motel. NOC is based in western North Carolina near Bryson City, near the Great Smoky Mountains on the Nantahala River. NOC is surrounded by Nantahala National Forest. The Appalachian Trail crosses the Nantahala River on a bridge next to the outfitter.

NOC operates whitewater rafting trips on eight Southeastern rivers: the Chattahoochee, Chattooga, Cheoah, French Broad, Nantahala, Nolichucky, Ocoee, and Pigeon. NOC in offers trips down each of these rivers, with the goal of providing enjoyment and getting people outside. To further that enjoyment and protect these areas the NOC works with various companies and organizations for conservation of these rivers and the surrounding land. They work closely with the Forest service on several of these rivers to help with conservation efforts, often being the first reporters of something happening in or around the river. 

NOC also teaches people to paddle in its canoe and kayak paddling school. They also offer mountain bike rentals, group programs, outdoor retail, restaurants, ropes courses, kayak touring, fly fishing and hiking.NOC lately offers tubing trips down the Chattahoochee river and ziplining at their home site in Bryson city. NOC offers a variety of outdoor education courses to the public. Aside from their different paddling classes that are offered they also offer wilderness medicine classes and swift water rescue classes. The wilderness medicine courses that are offered are wilderness first aid, wilderness first responder and wilderness EMT as well as wilderness survival course and a course for healthcare professionals that has wilderness components. All participants of their wilderness medicine classes can receive certification through SOLO Southeast, leaders in wilderness medicine training. 

In 2022, NOC will be offering international trips with a wide variety of excursions to choose from at each location. Some of the locations include British columbia, Argentina, Iceland and Africa. They will have a variety of trips to accommodate for different ages and experience levels. Many of the international trips venture to highly sought after places around the world. NOC international expeditions ventures to the ends of the earth from Mount Kilimanjaro to Machu Picchu to the Northern Lights in Iceland.  

Former NOC president John Burton (who, until recently, was an owner/operator of nearby Nantahala Village Resort) was a member of the original 1972 Olympic slalom team. His teammate Angus Morrison, currently a head guide for Nantahala River Guided Trips, was also on the Olympic team that year, as well as in 1976 and 1980. More recently, Olympians Lecky and Fritz Haller, Horace Holden Jr., Wayne Dickert (currently head of NOC Instruction), Joe Jacobi, Scott Strausbaugh and Scott Shipley have all trained with the Nantahala Racing Club at NOC on the Nantahala River.  Jacobi and Strausbaugh, paddling C-2, are the only Americans ever to have won an Olympic gold medal for the US in whitewater, which they did in Barcelona in 1992.NOC remains a training site for whitewater athletes in the US. Paddlers have come from all over to experience the Nantahala river and the NOC alike.

References

External links
 
 Official website of the Nantahala Racing Club

Buildings and structures in Swain County, North Carolina
North Carolina outdoor recreation
Tourist attractions in Swain County, North Carolina
Companies based in North Carolina